Daniel Thomas Williams Jr. (1932–2010) was an American archivist and historian. He was the first African American to be honored as a fellow of the Society of American Archivists and was Head University Librarian at Tuskegee University from 1968-1999.

Personal life and education 
Williams was born on September 20, 1932 to Willie Mae and Daniel T. Williams Sr. and grew up in Miami, Florida. He had two brothers, Emmett J. and Rodney M. Williams.

He graduated from West Virginia State College, now University, in 1956 with majors in Spanish and History. One year later, he received his Master’s in Library Science from the University of Illinois at Urbana-Champaign. He later returned to graduate school and graduated from American University with a certificate in archival administration in 1968. Williams did post-graduate work at both the University of Michigan and the University of Chicago. He returned once again for his doctorate from Auburn University in Alabama, where he graduated in 1987.

He retired in 1999 when he was diagnosed with Alzheimer's disease. He died on June 24, 2010 in Hollywood, Florida.

Career 
With his master’s, he was hired right after graduation at the Tuskegee Institute as a serials librarian in 1957. He later advanced to the position of Director of the University’s Professional Libraries in 1966 and later, the University Archivist in 1969.

Among many projects and responsibilities at Tuskegee, he became the curator for the Daniel James Memorial Hall in 1987. He also served as an Assistant Professor and continued to work in the Archives throughout his time there. He retired in 1999.

Affiliations 

 In 1972, Williams was part of the US Delegation of the World Congress on Archives, which met in Moscow. 
 Consultant for the Martin Luther King, Jr. Center for Social Change 
 Consultant for the Library of Congress Manuscript Division

Awards 

Academy of Certified Archivists, 1989
 Fellow of the Society of American Archivists, 1992

References 

University of Illinois School of Information Sciences alumni
Deaths from Alzheimer's disease
Deaths from dementia in Florida
American archivists
African-American historians
20th-century American historians
American male non-fiction writers
West Virginia State University alumni
1932 births
2010 deaths
Tuskegee University faculty
Auburn University alumni
American University alumni
Writers from Miami
Fellows of the Society of American Archivists
Historians from Florida
20th-century American male writers
20th-century African-American writers
21st-century African-American people
African-American male writers